8 Street SW station is a CTrain light rail station in Downtown Calgary, Alberta, Canada. The station is used only by eastbound trains. The platform for the station is located on the south side of 7 Avenue SW.

For Route 201 Southbound, it is the first station in Downtown Calgary, and within the Downtown free fare zone. The station is used by trains serving both Routes 201 and 202.

The original platform was located between 9 Street & 8 Street SW (adjacent to the Circle K) and opened on May 25, 1981, as part of Calgary's original LRT line from 8 Street W to Anderson. As part of the 7 Avenue Refurbishment Project, a new station was constructed one block east (between 8 Street & 7 Street SW and adjacent to Century Park) of its previous location and was opened on December 18, 2009. The original platform was immediately closed following the opening of the new platform and was demolished shortly afterwards.

Like all refurbished 7 Avenue stations, the entire sidewalk slopes up to the platform level and the platform can accommodate 4-car trains.

The station registered an average of 12,600 daily boardings in 2005.

According to the Calgary Transit website, in 2008, the ridership of the station of daily weekday boardings remained at an unchanged rate of 12,600 boardings.

References

CTrain stations
Railway stations in Canada opened in 1981